Baimuru Rural LLG is a local-level government (LLG) of Gulf Province, Papua New Guinea.

Wards
01. Amipoke (Ipiko language speakers)
03. Karurua Station
04. Bekoro
05. Mariki
06. Varia
07. Korovake
08. Ara'ava
09. Kaiarimai
10. Kapuna
11. Kinibo
12. Ikinu
13. Akoma
14. Mapaio
15. Aikavaravi
16. Maipenairu
17. Kapai
18. Apiope
19. Aumu
20. Poroi
21. Wabo
22. Uraru
23. Haia
80. Baimuru Station

References

Local-level governments of Gulf Province